Matthew Martin "Matty" McIntyre (June 12, 1880 – April 2, 1920) was an outfielder in Major League Baseball who played ten seasons with the Philadelphia Athletics (1901), Detroit Tigers (1904–10), and Chicago White Sox (1911–12).

Born in Stonington, Connecticut, and raised in Staten Island, New York, he helped the Tigers win the American League Pennant three times, from 1907 to 1909.

In 1,072 career games, McIntyre batted .269 with 562 runs, 1,066 hits, 140 doubles, 69 triples, 4 home runs, 319 RBI, 120 stolen bases, 439 walks, 1,356 total bases, and 87 sacrifice hits.

His best season was 1908, when he helped lead the Tigers to the World Series and was the second best hitter in the American League (behind teammate Ty Cobb).  In 1908, McIntyre was first in the American League in several categories: plate appearances (672), times on base (258), runs (105), and singles (131). In 1908, he was also among the leaders in almost every other offensive category: No. 2 in on-base percentage (.392), fifth in batting average (.295), fifth in slugging percentage (.385), fourth in OPS (.775), third in hits (168), 4th in total bases (218), 9th in doubles (24), fifth in triples (13), third in bases on balls (83), 3rd in runs created, and 7th in extra base hits (37).

Despite his impressive performance on the field, McIntyre may be best remembered as the leader of the "anti-Cobb" clique on the Tigers during Cobb's early years.  McIntyre joined the Tigers in 1904 and was a 26-year-old starter when 18-year-old Cobb joined the team in 1905.  Early in Cobb's rookie season, Cobb went after a flyball that was clearly in McIntyre's left field territory.  By cutting in front, Cobb caused McIntyre to drop the ball, infuriating McIntyre.  McIntyre was a Connecticut Yankee who had little in common with the taciturn kid from Georgia.  McIntyre and his cohorts led a prolonged hazing campaign, locking Cobb out of an empty washroom, flicking food at Cobb, and nailing his shoes to the clubhouse floor.  Cobb's legendary temper only added fuel to the fire, and the McIntyre-Cobb feud continued until McIntyre was sold to the White Sox after the 1910 season. (Cobb's feud with McIntyre is documented in Al Stump's 1994 book, "Cobb: The Life and Times of the Meanest Man Who Ever Played Baseball.")

McIntyre died of tuberculosis in 1920 in Detroit, Michigan. He was 39.

See also
 List of Major League Baseball annual runs scored leaders

References

External links

Photo dated 1912 from Library of Congress collection showing McIntyre in Chicago uniform

1880 births
1920 deaths
Major League Baseball outfielders
Baseball players from Connecticut
Philadelphia Athletics players
Detroit Tigers players
Chicago White Sox players
Major League Baseball left fielders
Major League Baseball right fielders
Minor league baseball managers
Buffalo Bisons (minor league) players
Newark Sailors players
San Francisco Seals (baseball) players
Providence Grays (minor league) players
Lincoln Tigers players
Mobile Sea Gulls players
20th-century deaths from tuberculosis
Tuberculosis deaths in Michigan